Joseph Marwa also recognized by his pen name Josephs Quartzy is a Tanzanian television actor, novelist and a former lead vocalist for the music duo The Eastern Bandits.

He is best known for playing Nhwale in the romance fiction film Mr. Local Man featuring Bonnie Dennison and for playing Josephs in the drama series JQ Knew That. Joseph has appeared in supporting roles in Lucifer'e and The Great Controversy, Homeboy Never Fails and a Jewish documentary africa (2019 film). He is the author of A Tale of an Intelligent Psychopath and Irene the Andromeda.

Publications
Novela and philosophy
 

Poetry

Filmography

Movies

TV shows

References
Notes

References

External links
Movie databases
Joseph Marwa at IMDb
Joseph Marwa at AfroDB
Joseph Marwa at Mubi
Joseph Marwa at Rotten Tomatoes
Joseph Marwa at Metacritic 
Joseph Marwa movies at Roku

Other sites
ISNI

Living people
Tanzanian male actors
1999 births
Tanzanian novelists
Tanzanian writers